DDB1 and CUL4 associated factor 8 is a protein that in humans is encoded by the DCAF8 gene.

Function

This gene encodes a WD repeat-containing protein that interacts with the Cul4-Ddb1 E3 ligase macromolecular complex. Multiple alternatively spliced transcript variants have been found for this gene. [provided by RefSeq, Jul 2009].

References

Further reading